The 14th Australian Recording Industry Association Music Awards (generally known as the ARIA Music Awards or simply The ARIAS) was held on 24 October 2000 at the Sydney Entertainment Centre. Presenters distributed 28 awards with the big winners for the year being Killing Heidi and Madison Avenue, each with four trophies. In addition to the annually presented awards, a "Special Achievement Award" was given to Daryl Somers; an "Outstanding Achievement Award" was received by Slim Dusty and another presented to Tina Arena. There were no ARIA Hall of Fame inductees.

Awards
Final nominees for awards are shown in plain, with winners in bold.

ARIA Awards
Album of the Year 
Killing Heidi – Reflector
David Bridie – Act of Free Choice
Alex Lloyd – Black the Sun
Savage Garden – Affirmation
Shihad – The General Electric
Single of the Year 
Madison Avenue – "Don't Call Me Baby"
28 Days – "Rip It Up"
Kasey Chambers – "The Captain"
Killing Heidi – "Mascara"
Powderfinger – "Passenger"
Highest Selling Album 
Savage Garden – Affirmation
Bardot – Bardot
Killing Heidi – Reflector
Taxiride – Imaginate
Vanessa Amorosi – The Power

Highest Selling Single 
Madison Avenue – "Don't Call Me Baby"
Bardot – "Poison"
Chris Franklin – "Bloke"
S2S – "Sister"
Vanessa Amorosi – "Absolutely Everybody"

Best Group
Killing Heidi – Reflector
Madison Avenue – "Don't Call Me Baby"
Powderfinger – "Passenger"
Savage Garden – Affirmation
Shihad – The General Electric
Best Female Artist 
Kasey Chambers – "The Captain"
Diana Ah Naid – I Don't Think I'm Pregnant
Vanessa Amorosi – "Absolutely Everybody"
Christine Anu – "Sunshine on a Rainy Day"
Kylie Minogue – "Spinning Around"
Best Male Artist
Alex Lloyd – Black the Sun
David Bridie – Act of Free Choice
Endorphin – Skin
Groove Terminator – Road Kill
Paul Kelly – Smoke
Breakthrough Artist – Album
Killing Heidi – Reflector
Vanessa Amorosi – The Power
Alex Lloyd – Black the Sun
Sonic Animation – Orchid for the Afterworld
Taxiride – Imaginate
Breakthrough Artist – Single
Madison Avenue – "Don't Call Me Baby"
28 Days – "Rip it Up"
Vanessa Amorosi – "Have a Look"
Augie March – "Asleep in Perfection (Waltz)"
Lo-Tel – "Teenager of the Year"
Best Dance Release
Pnau – Sambanova
Chili HiFly – "Is it Love?"
Madison Avenue – "Don't Call Me Baby"
Sonic Animation – Orchid for the Underworld
Wicked Beat Sound System – Inna Styles
Best Pop Release
Kylie Minogue – "Spinning Around"
Vanessa Amorosi – "Absolutely Everybody"
Frenzal Rhomb – "Never Had So Much Fun"
Savage Garden – Affirmation
Spiderbait – "Glokenpop"
Best Rock Album 
Killing Heidi – Reflector
Area 7 – Bitter & Twisted
Deadstar – Somewhere Over the Radio
Grinspoon – Easy
Shihad – The General Electric
Best Country Album
Troy Cassar-Daley – Big River
Adam Brand – Good Friends
Lee Kernaghan – Rules of the Road
Keith Urban – Keith Urban
John Williamson – The Way It Is
Best Blues & Roots Album 
Matt Walker – Soul Witness
Peter Gelling – Bluestime
Ruby Hunter – Feeling Good
Neil Murray – Wondering Kind
Mick Thomas – Under Starters Orders
Best Independent Release 
S2S – "Sister"
Diana Ah Naid – "I Don't Thing I'm Pregnant"
iOTA – "The Hip Bone Connection"
Skulker – Too Fat for Tahiti
Stella One Eleven – "Only Good for Conversation"
Best Alternative Release 
Dirty Three – Whatever You Love, You Are
28 Days – "Rip It Up"
David Bridie – Act of Free Choice
Nokturnl – "Neva Mend"
Tumbleweed – Mumbo Jumbo
Best Adult Contemporary Album 
Karma County – Into the Land of Promise
Marcia Hines – The Time of Our Lives
Icecream Hands – Sweeter Than the Radio
Michael Spiby – Ho's Kitchen
Vika and Linda – Two Wings
Best Comedy Release 
Guido Hatzis – Do Not Talk Over Me
Greg Champion – Stand Back Australia
Club Veg – We Suck – The Best of Sucked in Calls
Chris Franklin – "Bloke"
Elliot Goblet – Internally Berserk

Fine Arts Awards
Best Jazz Album 
James Muller Trio – All Out
Australian Art Orchestra, Sruthi Laya Ensemble – Into the Fire
The Catholics – Barefoot
Mike Nock, Marty Ehrlich – The Waiting Game
Janet Seidel – Art of Lounge Vol 2
Best Classical Album 
Gerard Willems – Beethoven: Complete Piano Sonatas
Rosamund Illing, Richard Bonynge, Australian Opera and Ballet Orchestra – Amoureuse: Sacred and Profane Arias
Michael Kieran Harvey – Messiaen: Twenty Contemplations of the Infant Jesus
Simon Tedeschi – Simon Tedeschi
Richard Tognetti, Australian Chamber Orchestra – Beethoven Violin Concerto & Mozart Symphony No. 40
Best Children's Album 
Hi-5 – Jump And Jive With Hi-5
The Flowerpot Gang – Flower Pot Gang
Mister Whiskers – Monkey Business
Play School – Hullabaloo
The Wiggles – It's a Wiggly Wiggly World
Best Original Cast / Show Recording 
Cast Recording – The Sound of Music
John Farnham – Live at the Regent
State Orchestra of Victoria, John Lanchbery – The Merry Widow
Various – Happy Days - The Arena Mega Musical
Best Original Soundtrack 
David Bridie – In a Savage Land
Iva Davies – The Ghost of Time
Paul Grabowsky – Siam Sunset
Various – Soft Fruit
Various – The Wog Boy
David Hirschfelder & Various Artists – What Becomes of the Broken Hearted?
Best World Music Album 
Chris Duncan – Fyvies Embrace - The Golden Age of the Scottish Fiddle
Riley Lee, Marshall McGuire – Spring Sea; Music for Shakuhachi and Harp
Timothy Kain and Virginia Taylor – Music of the Americas
Inka Marka – Auki Auki
Tim Gibuma and the Storm – The Gaba-Gaba Mawi

Artisan Awards
Producer of the Year
Steve James – Oblivia – "My Friend"
Augie March, Richard Pleasance – Augie March – "Asleep in Perfection"
Darren Hayes, Daniel Jones – Savage Garden – Affirmation
Rob Taylor, Tim Freedman – The Whitlams – "You Gotta Love This City"
Andy Van, Cheyne Coates – Madison Avenue – "Don't Call Me Baby"
Engineer of the Year 
All nominees tied for the Award in this year
Doug Brady – John Farnham – Live at the Regent
Jonathan Burnside – Grinspoon – Easy
Brent Clarke – Christine Anu – "Sunshine on a Rainy Day"
Iva Davies, Simon Leadley – Iva Davies – The Ghost of Time
Steve James – Oblivia – "My Friend"
Best Video
Mark Hartley – Madison Avenue – "Who the Hell Are You"
Bart Borghese – Nokturnl – "Neva Mend"
Mark Hartley – Bardot – "Poison"
Mark Hartley – Madison Avenue – "Don't Call Me Baby"
Paul Butler, Scott Walton – Regurgitator – "Happiness (Rotting My Brain)"
Best Cover Art 
Janet English – Spiderbait – "Glokenpop"
Mark Gowling – Groove Terminator – Road Kill
Paul Kosky – Killing Heidi – Reflector
Love Police – Various – Triple J Hottest 100 Vol 6
Kevin Wilkins – Powderfinger – "Passenger"

Achievement awards

Outstanding Achievement Award

Tina Arena "for selling in excess of one million albums across Europe."

Arena reflected on the award, "I have been around a long time. I've had an incredible time and I'm still learning many things. Receiving the award is wonderful as it's great to be recognised for the work you put in. I'm very proud." She described her colleagues, "I've worked with some wonderful people in Europe, like Desmond Child (worked with Ricky Martin) and Matthew Wilder (worked with No Doubt)."

Slim Dusty "for a career spanning over five decades (100 albums)."

Dusty described his works, "I started making private records in 1942 and got accepted to a recording contract of kind in 1946. It's hard to believe that I've done this many records. I still record very fast, getting the tracks down quickly, and I like to have young people around me in the process."

Special Achievement Award

Daryl Somers "for the contribution that Hey Hey It's Saturday made in providing an outlet for Australian artists to showcase their music." Hey Hey It's Saturday (1971–99) was an Australian TV variety show hosted and co-produced by Somers.

ARIA Hall of Fame inductees

There were no Hall of Fame inductees.

Performers

Performers included:
 Killing Heidi – "Superman/Supergirl"
 28 Days
 Bardot
 The Living End
 Christine Anu
 Madison Avenue – "Don't Call Me Baby"

References

External links
ARIA Awards official website
List of 2000 winners

2000 music awards
2000 in Australian music
ARIA Music Awards